Anna Bozsik (born 31 October 1965) is a Hungarian biathlete. She competed at the 1992, 1994 and the 1998 Winter Olympics. She also competed in three cross-country skiing events at the 1992 Winter Olympics.

References

External links
 

1965 births
Living people
Biathletes at the 1992 Winter Olympics
Biathletes at the 1994 Winter Olympics
Biathletes at the 1998 Winter Olympics
Cross-country skiers at the 1992 Winter Olympics
Hungarian female biathletes
Hungarian female cross-country skiers
Olympic biathletes of Hungary
Olympic cross-country skiers of Hungary
Place of birth missing (living people)
20th-century Hungarian women